Poulan Library is a historic and distinctively small library in Poulan, Georgia, United States. Sylvester-Worth County Chamber of Commerce</ref> It was added to the National Register of Historic Places on July 25, 2003. It is located on the south side of the 100 block of Church Street. It is open to the public on Thursday afternoons and by appointment.

See also
National Register of Historic Places listings in Worth County, Georgia

References

Libraries on the National Register of Historic Places in Georgia (U.S. state)
Buildings and structures in Worth County, Georgia
National Register of Historic Places in Worth County, Georgia